Blakas or Belakas is a general name for any sort of cleaver or large knife originating from Bali, Indonesia that has a heavy rectangular blade with a straight cutting edge used for chopping. The long, rounded hilt often becomes thinner at one or both ends. The blade often has a fanciful shape and encrusted motifs. Sometimes it is made for ceremonial purposes, and also used in pairs with golok. It is a common utensil in Balinese households and is used for kitchen chores, orchard work, and in ceremonial activities.

See also 

 Golok
 Parang

References 

Blade weapons
Daggers
Ritual weapons
Weapons of Indonesia
Balinese culture